Shimon Avidan (February 7, 1911 – September 11, 1994), born Siegbert Koch, was an Israeli soldier and officer, the commander of the Givati Brigade during the 1948 Arab-Israeli war.

Born in Germany, he moved to Mandatory Palestine in 1934, and lived on Kibbutz Ayelet HaShahar and then Ein HaShofet He fought with the International Brigades during the Spanish Civil War.

Avidan is also known for his activities in the Palmach in World War II. He led the "German Unit" of the Palmach, which was responsible for conducting guerrilla operations against the Axis powers. In 1945 he commanded the Saison operation against the Irgun and Lehi.

During the 1948 war he was the operational commander of Operation Nachshon, Operation Barak, Operation Pleshet and Operation An-Far. His troops also fought at Nitzanim as well as joining Operation Death to the Invader and Operation Yoav.

He resigned from the army after, according to Chaim Herzog, "His extreme left-wing philosophy proved to be irreconcilable with David Ben-Gurion's policies." In 1975, he was appointed as the internal comptroller of the Ministry of Defense by the minister Shimon Peres.

Avidan died in 1994 at age 83. Streets were named for him in Rishon LeZion and Beersheba.

References

1911 births
1994 deaths
Jewish emigrants from Nazi Germany to Mandatory Palestine
Israeli military personnel
Jewish socialists
Palmach members
Kibbutz Movements secretaries
International Brigades personnel